Bulles is an album by French singer-songwriter Michel Polnareff released in 1981.
With this album, the singer found more success, as it sold 800,000 copies. "Radio", "Je t'aime", and "Tam-Tam" were put into heavy rotation on French radio stations. Although mostly rock-oriented, Polnareff maintains his personality lyrically and musically.
In 2001, the album was re-issued by Universal-Polygram.

Track listing
Music by Michel Polnareff, lyrics by Michel Polnareff and J.P. Dréau.

Side A
 "Tam tam" 
 "Elle rit" (Translation: "She Laughs")
 "Radio" 
 "Je t'aime" (Translation: "I Love You")

Side B 
 "Où est la tosca?" 
 "Joue moi de toi" 
 "365 jours par an" (Translation: "365 Days A Year")
 "Bulles de savon" (Translation: "Soap Bubbles")

Personnel
 Ricky Hitchcock — guitars
 Mo Foster — bass
 Michel Polnareff – vocals, piano, keyboards, percussion, male and female chorus, arranger
 Richard Myhill – piano, keyboards, male chorus, musicians director
  – keyboards, violin solo
 Hans Zimmer — keyboards, keyboards layout
 Robin Landridge – keyboards
 Peter Van Hooke — drums
 Brett Morgan — drums
 Frank Ricotti — drums
 Mac Tontoh – drums
 Daku Potato – drums
 Allan Parker – banjo
 Linda Jardim – female chorus
 Modesty Forbids – female chorus
 Ray Springfield – flute

Production 
 Producer – M. Polnareff
 Engineer – Brad Davis, Steve Allan
 Mixing – R. Myhill, M. Polnareff, G. Preskett
 Mastering – B. Davis
 Album cover design – Hicks and Hayes
 Photography – John Thornton

Recorded at studios Snake Ranch, Nova, Marcus Music.

References 

1981 albums
Michel Polnareff albums